Kaviz-e Sofla (also Romanized as Kavīz-e Soflá; also known as Kavīz-e Pā’īn) is a village in Mardehek Rural District, Jebalbarez-e Jonubi District, Anbarabad County, Kerman Province, Iran. At the 2006 census, its population was 391, in 67 families.

References 

Populated places in Anbarabad County